Luis Miguel Limia Ponte y Manso de Zúñiga, eighth Marqués de Bóveda de Limia (1882-1952) was a Spanish military leader who participated in the military uprising against the Second Spanish Republic which developed into the Spanish Civil War. He was a member of the Board of National Defense and held the position of Chief of State of the Nationalist faction between July 24 and October 3, 1936, and held the rank of Lieutenant General.

Biography
An aristocrat and landowner, in 1924 he was a colonel of cavalry. In 1931, when the Second Spanish Republic was proclaimed, serving as Brigadier General, he requested his retirement from active duty. On August 10, 1932, Ponte participated in the failed coup d'état of José Sanjurjo, and in the face of defeat, fled to Portugal.

Upon the 1936 Coup, he collaborated with General Andrés Saliquet to assume control of Military Region VII (which corresponded to Valladolid). During the war, he was in charge of the 5th Infantry Division and later the Commander in Chief of Corps I and V of the rebel army. In December 1942 he paid a visit to Gibraltar. He arrived by car and crossed the frontier, and he inspected a British Guard of Honour. He was accompanied throughout his visit by British Lieutenant-General Mason MacFarlane. The General with Major-General Sir Colin Jardine and Major R Capurro, aide-de-camp to His Excellency. They saw the firing practice with Valentine tanks.
Ponte was a procurador (see Deputy (legislator)) of the Cortes in 1943 and 1949, in addition to being President of the Supreme Council of Military Justice.

20th-century Spanish people
1882 births
1952 deaths